Leslie Edward Claypool (born September 29, 1963) is an American musician, singer, songwriter, record producer, filmmaker, and author. He is best known as the founder, lead singer, bassist, and primary songwriter of the band Primus since its formation in 1984. Frequently considered to be one of the greatest bassists of all time, his playing style is well known for mixing tapping, flamenco-like strumming, whammy bar bends, and slapping.

Outside of Primus, Claypool has also been involved in a number of side projects, including supergroups such as Oysterhead (with Trey Anastasio and Stewart Copeland) and Colonel Claypool's Bucket of Bernie Brains (with Buckethead, Bryan Mantia, and Bernie Worrell). He also fronted the experimental rock projects Colonel Les Claypool's Fearless Flying Frog Brigade and Les Claypool's Fancy Band. He has self-produced and engineered several solo releases from his own studio, Rancho Relaxo, in California. In 2006, he wrote and directed the mockumentary Electric Apricot and released his debut novel South of the Pumphouse. More recently, he has formed musical duos such as Duo de Twang (with Bryan Kehoe) and The Claypool Lennon Delirium (with Sean Lennon).

Early life 
Claypool was born into a working-class family of car mechanics in Richmond, California, in 1963, and was raised in El Sobrante, California. He learned to play the bass guitar at age 14, but didn't begin a career in music until much later. He worked as a carpenter for several years after graduating from high school.

Career

Early career
After the death of Metallica bassist Cliff Burton in 1986, Metallica guitarist Kirk Hammett encouraged Claypoolhis friend and former schoolmateto audition as Burton's successor. In the Metallica episode of the documentary series Behind the Music, Claypool said that he jokingly asked the members of Metallica if they wanted to "jam on some Isley Brothers tunes" during the audition, a reference to his lack of experience with Metallica's thrash metal style. He later recalled that Hammett had given him a copy of Metallica's 1984 album Ride the Lightning, which he enjoyed, but overall "wasn't a big metal guy" and did not realize how popular Metallica had become until he arrived at the audition. Metallica frontman James Hetfield said that Claypool was not offered the job because "he was too good" and "should do his own thing". Claypool responded by admitting that he "wasn't the right guy" for the band due to being a self-proclaimed "weirdo", and stated his belief that Hetfield was just "being nice" with his comments.

Primus

Primus began as "Primate" in the mid-1980s, with Claypool on bass, Todd Huth on guitar, and various drummers, most notably Jay Lane, though Huth and Lane left shortly thereafter to pursue other projects. Claypool replaced them with guitarist Larry LaLonde and drummer Tim Alexander.

Claypool is considered to be the leader of the band, as well as the driving force behind its blending of funk with other genres. Claypool frequently utilizes the slap-bass technique, prominent in funk music, and is the only member of Primus who comes from a funk background. Because of Claypool's strong funk influence, Primus is often described as "thrash-funk" or funk metal, though Claypool dislikes these labels, stating: "We've been lumped in with the funk metal thing just about everywhere. I guess people just have to categorize you.

From 1989 to 2000, Primus was one of the most unusual bands to gain significant mainstream airplay, headlining Lollapalooza in 1993, appearing on Late Show with David Letterman and Late Night with Conan O'Brien in 1995, and even appearing at Woodstock '94, where they performed their Pork Soda hit "My Name Is Mud" and were consequently pelted with mud by the audience, much to the band's displeasure, even driving Claypool to stop playing, and telling the audience "the song's called My Name is Mud, but keep the mud to yourself you son of a bitch". In 1991, the band was featured in the movie Bill & Ted's Bogus Journey, performing "Tommy the Cat" live. Claypool and Tom Waits first recorded on each other's records in 1991 and have continued to do so since. In 1997, Primus was asked to play and record the theme song for the animated television show South Park. In 1999, he allowed Activision's use of the song "Jerry Was a Race Car Driver" in the popular video game Tony Hawk's Pro Skater. Primus went on hiatus in 2000.

In mid-2003, Claypool reunited with former Primus drummer Tim Alexander and guitarist Larry LaLonde to record a DVD/EP called Animals Should Not Try to Act Like People. In October of the same year, the band embarked on a two-month tour in which two sets were performed per show, the second set consisting of their 1991 release Sailing the Seas of Cheese being performed in its entirety. Primus continued touring into 2004, performing their 1990 release Frizzle Fry as their second set, as documented on the DVD Hallucino-Genetics: Live 2004.

On October 17, 2006, Primus released both their first greatest hits album, They Can't All Be Zingers, and their third DVD, Blame It on the Fish, subtitled An Abstract Look at the 2003 Primus Tour De Fromage. The band toured in 2006 on their Primus: The Beat a Dead Horse Tour 2006, and played at a small number of festivals in 2008.

In 2010, Alexander, who had left the band for the second time due to lack of interest, was replaced by Jay Lane, who had not played with the band since 1988.  The band subsequently resumed touring after the free June 2010 Rehearsal was released later that year, and a studio album, Green Naugahyde, was released in 2011.

In 2013, Lane left Primus for the second time to focus on his other band RatDog, who were coming off hiatus at the time, and was replaced again by Alexander.  Primus' eighth studio album, Primus & the Chocolate Factory with the Fungi Ensemble, a re-imagining of the soundtrack from the 1971 film Willy Wonka & the Chocolate Factory, was released in October 2014.

In 2017, Primus released The Desaturating Seven, an album that is based on a bedtime story published by Italian author Ul de Rico, which is about a group of rainbow eating goblins. They then began a tour with Mastodon through most of 2018.

Solo work

Sausage 

In 1988 Claypool started a short-lived alternative/funk rock band featuring Todd Huth on guitar and Jay Lane on drums. The group released their first album in April 1994 "Riddles Are Abound Tonight" by Prawn Song Records, and did a few short tours and opened for groups such as Helmet, Rollins Band, and Slayer. The band reunited for a show on December 31, 2019, opening for The Claypool Lennon Delirium and have not returned since.

Holy Mackerel 

In 1996, Claypool produced, engineered and released a solo album, "Les Claypool and the Holy Mackerel presents" Highball with the Devil. Claypool is credited with bass, drums and vocals on several tracks as well as guitar. Also on the album are Mark "Mirv" Haggard, Adam Gates, Jay Lane, Joe Gore, Charlie Hunter and Henry Rollins. The accompanying tour included Haggard and Gates on guitars with Bryan Mantia on drums. It was announced during the Holy Mackerel tour that Mantia had been chosen to become the next Primus drummer.

Oysterhead 

In April 2000, Claypool collaborated with Trey Anastasio (of Phish) and Stewart Copeland (of the Police) to form a supergroup called Oysterhead. Claypool and Anastasio had been looking for an opportunity to collaborate. Each had a mutual interest in playing with Copeland who had been a rock idol of their teen years. Plus, Claypool and Copeland already had an established friendship. Oysterhead were originally intended as a one time performance during Jazz Fest in New Orleans. Though timid of the band's sudden and surprising popularity they eventually decided to record and tour. They released one studio album, The Grand Pecking Order, and toured before disbanding in 2001. They re-united in 2006, at the Bonnaroo Music Festival. In 2016 Les tried to reunite the group, but ended up releasing an album with The Claypool Lennon Delirium. Fortunately, they re-united once again in 2020 for two shows at the 1stBank Center in Broomfield, Colorado, with the rest of their tour cut short by the COVID-19 pandemic.

The Frog Brigade 

In May 2000, Claypool formed Les Claypool's Fearless Flying Frog Brigade, an experimental rock group.  Claypool was asked to put together a band for the Mountain Aire Festival in Angels Camp, California. The band "of the most incredible guys (he) could possibly find" debuted that Memorial Day weekend and played a number of other festivals including moe.down. Originally he was going to call the band "Les Claypool's Thunder Brigade". Claypool states:

I originally was going to do the two drummer thing with Herb and Jack Irons, so I was gonna call it the Les Claypool Thunder Brigade. Michael Bailey from Bill Graham Presents said to me that it may sound a bit too heavy for the Mountain Aire crowd and to perhaps try something a little different that had to do with the event itself. Since it was home of the Calaveras County Frog Jump... hence the Frog Brigade and then it evolved into Colonel Les Claypool's Fearless Flying Frog Brigade.

The Primus hiatus allowed him to return to his musical roots, playing songs by bands such as Pink Floyd, King Crimson, and the Beatles. Claypool has called the Frog Brigade his "mid-life crisis band". From a set of October shows recorded at Great American Music Hall in San Francisco, Claypool released two Frog Brigade live albums, one being a cover of Pink Floyd's Animals. The line-up included Todd Huth, Eenor, Jeff Chimenti, Jay Lane, Skerik and Claypool.

The Frog Brigade is also noted for Claypool's being accepted into the jam band scene. Live Frogs Set 1 won "Best Live Album" at the second annual Jammys. Jay Lane and Jeff Chimenti are both members of Bob Weir's bands Ratdog and Wolf Bros. Claypool performed with the Rat Brigade when opening for Ratdog once in 2000 and again in 2007. The Rat Brigade includes Claypool, drummer Lane and keyboardist Chimenti, with guest appearances by saxophonist Kenny Brooks and Bob Weir.
Claypool also guested on the Ratdog sets in 2000, 2006 and 2009.

In 2002, Claypool released a studio album of the Frog Brigade, Purple Onion. Musicians on multiple tracks for Purple Onion include Warren Haynes (Gov't Mule) Eenor, Mike Dillon, Skerik, Jay Lane, Ben Barnes and Sam Bass (Dillon and Skerik were both from Critters Buggin while Barnes and Sam Bass were from Deadweight). This album includes "Whamola" which later appeared as a remix for the theme of South Park Season 10.

C2B3 

Also in 2002, Claypool collaborated with guitarist Buckethead, Parliament-Funkadelic/Talking Heads keyboardist Bernie Worrell, and former Primus drummer Bryan Mantia under the name Colonel Claypool's Bucket of Bernie Brains (stylized "C2B3," which is to be pronounced as "C Squared, B Cubed"). Their concerts pushed the improvisational envelope by preparing no material and not rehearsing beforehand. At one of their shows they prepared sandwiches onstage for the audience to eat.

C2B3 re-united in 2004 to record The Big Eyeball in the Sky, an album with equal parts instrumental and vocal songs. The band began an 18-state tour of the US on September 24, 2004. Aux TV was dismissive of Claypool's effort, but when the tour landed back in Northern California where Claypool lives, the local press gave a very positive review.

The album features only one guest, the childlike multi-instrumentalist Gabby La La (noted as Gabby Lang on Les Claypool's Frog Brigade's Purple Onion) on vocals and sitar. She also opened on every show (sometimes to scathingly negative reviews) during the 2004 tour as a solo act, and sometimes with members of C2B3. Claypool also produced and performed on Gabby La La's first album, Be Careful What You Wish For.... Gabby La La is the first artist Les has signed to his label since Charlie Hunter in 1993. He has performed select shows with her (including the 2005 Bonnaroo Music Festival) and added her to his then new touring band, Les Claypool & His Fancy Band. The 2005 Fancy Band line-up also included Skerik, Dillon and Lane.

At the end of 2005, Claypool released 5 Gallons of Diesel, a video retrospective of all of his work away from Primus.

2006

Of Whales and Woe and the Fancy Band 

On May 30, 2006, Claypool released a solo album, Of Whales and Woe, with guest appearances by Skerik, Mike Dillon and Gabby La La. This album includes the song "Robot Chicken", which is the theme song of the popular Adult Swim show of the same name. His son Cage and his daughter Lena even make a special appearance on the song "Back Off Turkey". The release was followed by a tour of the U.S. with the following lineup:

Les Claypool – Bass Guitar, Upright Bass, Bassjo, vocals
Skerik – Tenor Saxophone
Mike Dillon – Vibraphone, Percussion
Gabby La La – Sitar, Theremin
Paulo Baldi – Drums

This lineup is called Les Claypool's Fancy Band and did national tours in both 2006 and 2007. A live DVD, Fancy, recorded from the 2006 tour was released in 2007. The audio track includes a mix of both soundboard and taper recordings.  A song from the album, "One Better", was used in National Lampoon's TV: The Movie in a fight scene between Preston Lacy and Lee Majors.

2007–2016 

Besides touring in the summer of 2007 nationally with the Fancy Band, Claypool performed that October with a version of the band, dubbed the Fancy Trio. The trio consisted of Claypool, Skerik on saxophone, and Mike Dillon on drums, vibraphone and percussion. They played at The Echo Project, an inaugural ecologically minded 3-day festival in Fairburn, Georgia on the Boukeart family farm. The set was similar to that of the Fancy Band's tours, culling from Claypool' solo and Frog Brigade albums, as well containing a cover of "One Step Beyond" by Madness and teases of other songs, including several Primus tunes, throughout their improvisational jams.

For many years Claypool has done a New Year's Eve show at The Fillmore in San Francisco. More recently the New Year's Eve show has been an Annual New Year's Eve Hatter's Ball featuring a hat contest. December 31, 2007, was the 3rd such annual event.

In 2008, a United States tour spanned from February 29 to April 5. It kicked off at the Neighborhood Theatre in Charlotte, North Carolina and ended at The Warfield in San Francisco. The 2008 tour was a quartet featuring Claypool, Dillon, Skerik and Baldi.

During the year Claypool also performed several shows with Primus at festivals across America and Canada.

Pig Hunt is a film directed by James Isaac released in 2008. Claypool contributes previously unreleased material and plays the role of "The Preacher".

Claypool composed several songs for the Wii game Mushroom Men, released in December 2008.

On December 31, 2008, Claypool rang in the New Year with his annual New Year's Eve show.  It was at the San Francisco Opera House with Zappa Plays Zappa sharing the bill and playing first.

Claypool was also a judge for the 7th annual Independent Music Awards.  His contributions helped assist upcoming independent artists' careers.

Claypool's second solo album, Of Fungi and Foe, was released on March 17, 2009. The album consists of expanded material of the music from the Mushroom Men game, as well as the Pig Hunt motion picture, and features a guest appearance by Gogol Bordello's Eugene Hutz.

In 2009, Claypool toured with Matisyahu, performing as a 'double-feature' set, as well as appearing together on stage.

On March 28, 2010, Claypool performed a rendition of Rush's "The Spirit of Radio" for their induction into the Canadian Songwriter's Hall of Fame.

From May 2010 to July 2013, Claypool toured extensively with Primus, alongside Larry LaLonde, and the return of former Primus drummer, Jay Lane. On September 6, 2012, a new side project was revealed as an acoustic band called Duo de Twang. Featuring Claypool and originally Marc Haggard. After two shows, Haggard was replaced with Bryan Kehoe. Both guitarists play together in the associated band M.I.R.V.

On September 25, 2013, it was announced Jay Lane had left Primus to rejoin the Bob Weir group RatDog. His replacement was declared to be Tim Alexander. Claypool and Dean Ween are currently working together for a reality TV show called Musishermen, and Duo de Twang is preparing for the release of their debut album, Four Foot Shack.

On February 4, 2014, Duo de Twang released their debut album Four Foot Shack and began touring in late February. In the last part of the 2014 Spring Tour, Primus's drummer, Tim Alexander, had a small heart attack which rendered him unable to play. Luckily instead of canceling the September shows, they were able to use their close friend Danny Carey for the late shows.

On January 19, 2016, it was announced that The Claypool Lennon Delirium, a collaboration between Claypool and Sean Lennon, would debut at Bonnaroo 2016. Claypool has spoken fondly of the collaboration, stating, "Sean is a musical mutant after my own heart. He definitely reflects his genetics – not just the sensibilities of his dad, but also the abstract perspective and unique approach of his mother. It makes for a glorious freak stew."

On March 21, 2016, it was announced that the duo would release their debut album, entitled Monolith of Phobos, on June 3, 2016. Their second album, South of Reality, was released February 22, 2019.

On May 31, 2016, he was featured on the Death Grips song "More Than The Fairy".

The Claypool Lennon Delirium 
In 2016, Claypool formed a group with Sean Lennon of The Ghost of a Saber Tooth Tiger, Paulo Baldi of Cake, and João Nogueira of Stone Giant. Les met Sean in 2015 when he was on tour with Primus, The Ghost of a Saber Tooth Tiger, and Dinosaur Jr. Les stayed in touch with Sean and the group released their first album The Monolith Of Phobos in 2016. On their first tour they switched out their keyboardist Money Mark of Beastie Boys for Pete Drungle. In 2017, The Delirium returned with their EP Lime And Limpid Green and released their second album South Of Reality in 2019, this time with João on Keys.

Other work 
Claypool was a special guest star in a Space Ghost Coast to Coast episode with the most celebrities on Cartoon Network in 1996.

Claypool's first book, South of the Pumphouse, was released on July 1, 2006, by Akashic Books. Copies of the book were sold during Claypool's 2006 tour of the U.S. following the release of Of Whales and Woe. The book is a dark tale of brothers, murder, drugs, and fishing, and has been likened to the work of Hunter S. Thompson. Claypool gave his first interview about the book on May 11, 2006.

Also in 2006, Claypool write and directed the mockumentary film Electric Apricot: Quest For Festeroo. It was shown at various film festivals and is a spoof of the jam band scene centered on the fake band Electric Apricot, with Claypool also playing the band's drummer and backing vocalist. The band performed real shows in the California area (such as High Sierra Music Festival) for the filming of the movie. During a question and answer session at the Tiburon Film Festival, where the film debuted, Claypool said that the DVD would have an accompanying soundtrack CD. The film has won awards including Best Feature (audience choice) at the Malibu Film Festival. Claypool also said that the band would possibly perform a few select shows, but a tour never transpired as the film's star Adam Gates worked for Pixar, which made touring difficult.

In 2007, Claypool created Claypool Cellars, a wine-making project that turned into a boutique business. It makes wine from grapes grown in California's Russian River Valley. The wines are named based on his music, such as "Purple Pachyderm" and "Pink Platypus".

Artistry 
Claypool is well known for his distinctive bass-playing, which aside from being quite dominant in the majority of his music also includes the use of several unusual techniques, such as Flamenco-style strumming, tapping, slapping and guitar-like chording. Claypool has also made prominent use of a Kahler "bass tremolo" vibrato system, as well as effects such as fuzz boxes and envelope filters. For most of his career, Claypool has played four-stringed basses, but has experimented with extended-range basses, most notably six-stringed models, as heard on songs like "Jerry Was a Race Car Driver", which features Claypool tapping the main melody on a fretless six-string bass.

Claypool has cited Larry Graham, Chris Squire, Tony Levin, Roger Waters, Geddy Lee, Paul McCartney, Geezer Butler, Bootsy Collins, Stanley Clarke, John Paul Jones, and the Residents as his musical influences.

Personal life 
Claypool has been noted for his eccentric personality, surreal sense of humor, and cannabis use.

"Les Claypool Day" was declared in Cincinnati by mayor John Cranley on June 12, 2018. The declaration was presented to Claypool during Primus' show that night at the Riverbend Music Center by members of the Cincinnati USA Music Heritage Foundation alongside Claypool's friend, influence, and Cincinnati native Bootsy Collins.

Discography

Guest appearances
(Claypool on bass unless otherwise noted)
1992 – Tom Waits – Bone Machine (on the track "Earth Died Screaming")
1994 – Firehose – Big Bottom Pow Wow (in discussion on the various "spiel" tracks)
1994 – Rob Wasserman – Trios (on the tracks "Home is Where You Get Across" and "3 Guys Named Schmo")
1996 – Alex Lifeson – Victor (on the track "The Big Dance")
1998 – Jerry Cantrell – Boggy Depot (on the tracks "Between" and "Cold Piece")
1998 – Metallica – Garage Inc. (banjo on the Lynyrd Skynyrd cover "Tuesday's Gone")
1998 – Bloem de Ligny – Zink (vocals on the track "Capsule")
1999 – Tom Waits – Mule Variations (on the track "Big in Japan")
1999 – Kenny Wayne Shepherd Band – Live On (on the track "Oh Well")
1999 – Limp Bizkit – Significant Other (vocals on the hidden track "The Mind of Les", bass and vocals on the outtake "Hell of a Band")
1999 – Phonopsycograph Disk – Live @ Slim's / Turbulence Chest (additional bass on 8 of the 12 tracks)
2002 – Fishbone – Fishbone and the Familyhood Nextperience Present: The Friendliest Psychosis of All (bass on track 1)
2002 – Gov't Mule – The Deep End, Volume 2 (bass and vocals on the tracks "Greasy Granny's Gopher Gravy" and "Drivin' Rain")
2003 – Gov't Mule – The Deepest End, Live In Concert (bass and vocals on the tracks "Greasy Granny's Gopher Gravy" and "Drivin' Rain")
2004 – Tom Waits – Real Gone (on the tracks "Hoist That Rag", "Shake It" and "Baby Gonna Leave Me")
2004 – Jack Irons – Attention Dimension (on the Pink Floyd cover "Shine On You Crazy Diamond")
2005 – Adrian Belew – Side One (on the tracks "Ampersand", "Writing on the Wall" and "Matchless Man")
2005 – Gabby La La – Be Careful What You Wish For... (bass and percussion throughout)
2005 – Mat Callahan – A Wild Bouquet (on the track "I See the Light")
2006 – Adrian Belew – Side Three (on the tracks "Whatever" and "Men in Helicopters v4.0")
2006 – Tom Waits – Orphans: Brawlers, Bawlers, and Bastards (on the track "On The Road")
2008 – Zach Hill – Astrological Straits (on the track "Astrological Straits")
2009 – Vinyl – Fogshack Music Volume Two (on the tracks "Jelly James Jam", "Le Colonel", "Benthos" and "Le Colonel Part Deux")
2011 – Hank Williams III – Ghost to a Ghost/Gutter Town (on the tracks "Ghost to a Ghost" and "With the Ship")
2011 – Tom Waits – Bad as Me (on the track "Satisfied")
2013 – Beats Antique – A Thousand Faces: Act 1 (bass and vocals on the track "Beezlebub")
2016 – Death Grips – "More Than The Fairy"
2019 – The Desert Sessions – "Volume 11 – Arrivederci Despair"

Soundtracks and compilations 

1991 – Guitars that Rule the World (promo for Guitar World magazine, featuring the original track "Filet of Soul" by Alex Skolnick with Claypool and Bryan Mantia)
1993 – Radio 501 (promo for Levi's jeans, featuring the original track "Can't Live Without" by Claypool, Jay Lane & Rob Wasserman)
2002 – NASCAR: Crank It Up (promo for NASCAR on Fox, featuring a cover of the Commander Cody track "Hot Rod Lincoln" recorded by Claypool)
2002 – Bonnaroo Music Festival 2002 (live album, featuring the Les Claypool's Frog Brigade track "Locomotive Breath")
2002 – Bonnaroo Vol. 2 (live album, featuring the Colonel Claypool's Bucket of Bernie Brains track "Number Two")
2004 – Concrete Corner: October Sampler 2004 (featuring the Colonel Claypool's Bucket of Bernie Brains track "Junior")
2004 – Never Been Done (soundtrack, featuring the Les Claypool's Frog Brigade track "David Makalaster")
2004 – Not In Our Name (benefit compilation album, featuring the Les Claypool's Frog Brigade track "David Makalaster II")
2004 – Under the Influence: Tribute to Lynyrd Skynyrd (compilation album, track "Call Me the Breeze")
2006 – Barnyard (soundtrack, featuring the original track "Hittin' the Hay" by North Mississippi Allstars with Claypool)
2008 – Pig Hunt (soundtrack, featuring the original tracks "Goblins in the Forest", "What You Lookin' At Boy?", "Boonville Stomp" and "Male Organ-Grinder")

Television show theme songs

2005–present – Robot Chicken: seasons 1–4 ("Robot Chicken", released on Of Whales and Woe, 2006)
2006–present – South Park: seasons 10–16 (mashup of "Whamola" by Les Claypool's Frog Brigade and "South Park Theme" by Primus)

Video game soundtracks
2008 – Mushroom Men: The Spore Wars (original tracks)

Videography 

1991 – Bill & Ted's Bogus Journey, features Les Claypool performing with Primus.
2002 – Rising Low (Documentary on Allen Woody, directed by Mike Gordon)
2002 – Various Artists – Live from Bonnaroo Music Festival 2002 (featuring Les Claypool's Frog Brigade and Colonel Claypool's Bucket of Bernie Brains)
2003 – Gov't Mule – The Deepest End, Live In Concert
2005 – Les Claypool – 5 Gallons of Diesel
2007 – Les Claypool – Fancy
2008 – Electric Apricot: Quest for Festeroo (Rock- mockumentary feature film)
2011 – A Cure for Pain: The Mark Sandman Story (documentary on Mark Sandman)

See also 
Avant-garde
Buckethead
Charlie Hunter Trio (1993)
Duo de Twang
Oysterhead
Tom Waits
Warren Haynes
List of celebrities who own wineries and vineyards

References

External links 

 
 
 Primus and Side Project Live Performances

 
1963 births
American male singers
American heavy metal bass guitarists
American male bass guitarists
American heavy metal singers
American rock double-bassists
Male double-bassists
American rock bass guitarists
Songwriters from California
Living people
Musicians from Richmond, California
Primus (band) members
People from El Sobrante, Contra Costa County, California
Steampunk
Alternative metal bass guitarists
People from Occidental, California
Guitarists from California
Blind Illusion members
Colonel Les Claypool's Fearless Flying Frog Brigade members
Les Claypool's Fancy Band members
20th-century American guitarists
21st-century double-bassists
Oysterhead members
Colonel Claypool's Bucket of Bernie Brains members
Alternative metal singers
American carpenters